This is a list of reference books on the subject(s) of Star Trek, which does not include fan-published works. For more details on in-universe technical manuals, please see List of Star Trek technical manuals.

 
Reference books
Lists of books based on works